Stethophyma is a genus of grasshoppers in the family Acrididae, with species found in Europe, North America and Japan.

Species
Species include:
Stethophyma celatum Otte, 1979
Stethophyma gracile Scudder, 1862
Stethophyma grossum Linnaeus, 1758
Stethophyma kevani Storozhenko & Otte, 1994
Stethophyma lineatum Scudder, 1862
Stethophyma magister Rehn, 1902

Gallery

References

Caelifera
Orthoptera of Europe